Josemar Silva dos Santos or simply  Gil Bala  (born 18 October 1980 in João Pessoa) is a Brazilian footballer.

Career
Gil Bala previously played for Yverdon-Sport FC in Switzerland, arriving in June 2000. He also played for Fluminense in the 2004 Copa do Brasil. He spent the following season with K.F.C. Germinal Beerschot in the Jupiler League.

References

External links
 Information and photo of Josemar dos Santos Silva at arsenal-kiev.com.ua

1980 births
Living people
Brazilian footballers
Brazilian expatriate footballers
Yverdon-Sport FC players
Fluminense FC players
Beerschot A.C. players
FC Arsenal Kyiv players
Belgian Pro League players
Ukrainian Premier League players
Association football forwards
Expatriate footballers in Ukraine
Brazilian expatriate sportspeople in Ukraine
Expatriate footballers in Belgium
Expatriate footballers in Switzerland
Expatriate footballers in the United Arab Emirates